Renihilation is the debut album from Brooklyn, New York black metal band Liturgy. It was released on May 8, 2009, through 20 Buck Spin Records. It was reissued on the Thrill Jockey record label on August 26, 2014.

Track listing

Personnel
Tyler Dusenbury – bass guitar
Greg Fox – drums
Bernard Gann – guitars
Hunter Hunt-Hendrix – vocals, guitars, songwriter
Recorded and mastered by Colin Marston

References

2009 debut albums
Liturgy (band) albums